The 1924 South Dakota gubernatorial election was held on November 4, 1924.  Incumbent Republican Governor William H. McMaster declined to run for re-election to a third term, instead opting to run for the U.S. Senate. Lieutenant Governor Carl Gunderson won the Republican primary unopposed. In the general election, he faced three prominent opponents: Democratic nominee William J. Bulow, a former State Senator and Mayor of Beresford; Farmer–Labor nominee A. L. Putnam; and perennial candidate Richard O. Richards. Gunderson. With the left-leaning vote split, Gunderson won the election in a landslide.

Primary elections

Democratic primary

Candidates
 Andrew S. Anderson, former State Senator from Clay County
 Eric J. Ellefson, State Senator from Minnehaha County

Results

On August 11, 1924, Anderson was killed by a bull on his farm. The South Dakota Democratic Party's central committee met to select a replacement for Anderson on August 20, 1924. However, few candidates wanted to accept the nomination. State Senator John B. Johnson declined to be a candidate, though the committee viewed him as their preferred candidate. Ultimately, William J. Bulow—a former State Senator, Union County Judge, and Mayor of Beresford—was selected by the committee as its replacement nominee.

Republican primary
Lieutenant Governor Carl Gunderson was the only Republican candidate to file for Governor, removing the race from the primary election ballot.

Farmer–Labor primary

Candidates
 A. L. Putnam
 Eric J. Ellefson, State Senator from Minnehaha County

Results

General election

Results

References

South Dakota
1924
Gubernatorial
November 1924 events